Bourboulenc is a white wine grape variety primarily grown in southern France. The variety is found in the regions Southern Rhône, Provence and Languedoc.

Bourboulenc is a late-ripening grape variety with tight bunches of large grapes, that can be prone to rot in some years. Bourboulenc wine has a good acidity level, body, penetrating character, citrus aromas and a hint of smoke. However, if the grapes are picked too soon, the wines have a thin, neutral taste.

Wines 

Varietal Bourboulenc is rare, but is allowed into a number of white wine appellations of southern France. Only in white La Clape, a geographical designation that may be used in conjunction with the Appellation d'Origine Contrôlée (AOC) Coteaux du Languedoc, is Bourboulenc the dominant grape variety. White La Clape must contain a minimum of 40% Bourboulenc.

Appellations where Bourboulenc may be included 

French AOCs that may include the variety are:
 Bandol AOC
 Cassis AOC
 Châteauneuf-du-Pape AOC, where Bourboulenc was grown on 1% of the vineyard surface in 2004.
 Coteaux d'Aix-en-Provence AOC
 Côtes du Luberon AOC
 Côtes du Rhône AOC
 Côtes du Rhône-Villages AOC
 Côtes du Ventoux AOC
 Lirac AOC
 Tavel AOC
 Vacqueyras AOC

History 

Bourboulenc has been grown in southern France for centuries, and has been proposed to be of Greek origin. The French vineyard area grown with Bourboulenc dropped by about half in the 1970s and doubled again in the 1980s, and Bourboulenc has primarily increased in popularity in Languedoc.

Synonyms 

Synonyms for Bourboulenc include Berlou blanc, Blanquette, Blanquette du Frontonnais, Blanquette du Gard, Blanquette menue, Bourbojlanc, Bourboulenco, Bourbouleng, Bourboulenque, Bourbounenco, Burbulen, Clairette dorée à Paulhan, Clairette à grains ronds, Clairette blanche, Clairette dorée, Clairette grosse, Clairette rousse, Clairette rousse du Var, Doucillon, Frappad, Grosse Clairette, Malvoisie, Malvoisie à la Clape, Mourterille, Ondenc, Picardan, Roussaou, Roussette, Roussette du Vaucluse. Note that these synonyms overlap with the proper names and synonyms of several other varieties of Rhône and nearby regions, such as Altesse, Clairette Blanche and Picardan.

References 

White wine grape varieties
Grape varieties of France